Shivane is a village and gram panchayat in India, situated in the Haveli  taluka of Pune district in the state of Maharashtra.

Administration
The village is administrated by a sarpanch, an elected representative who leads a gram panchayat. At the time of the 2011 Census of India, the village was the headquarters for the eponymous gram panchayat, which also governed the village of Sadavali.

Demographics
At the 2011 census, the village comprised 384 households. The population of 2067 was split between 1053 males and 1014 females.

See also
List of villages in Mawal taluka
Bhooj Adda Pune, Best restaurant in Pune.

References

Villages in Mawal taluka
Gram Panchayats in Pune district